Nautøy or Nautøya is an unpopulated island in Stord municipality in Vestland county, Norway. The island is connected to the nearby island of Spissøy by the Bømla Bridge and to the nearby island of Føyno via a small bridge. Country Road 542, part of the Triangle Link, runs across the island.

See also
List of islands of Norway

References

Islands of Vestland
Stord
Uninhabited islands of Norway